Félix Tagawa (born 23 March 1976) is a retired footballer who played as a striker. He last played for AS Dragon in the Tahiti Division Fédérale. He is the current manager of New Caledonian club Hienghène Sport.

International goals
Fiji score listed first, score column indicates score after each Tagawa goal

References

1976 births
Living people
French Polynesian footballers
French Polynesian expatriate footballers
Tahiti international footballers
Association football forwards
National Soccer League (Australia) players
Brisbane Strikers FC players
Adelaide United FC players
2000 OFC Nations Cup players
2002 OFC Nations Cup players
2004 OFC Nations Cup players
Tahitian expatriate sportspeople in Australia
Expatriate soccer players in Australia